Barrage is the self-titled debut album by the Canadian band of the same name. It was recorded by the original cast of Barrage and was released in the year 2000. The album contains many songs performed in the group's "A Violin Sings, A Fiddle Dances" world concert tour.

Track listing
"Chopsticken" - 4:02
"Old Joe Clark" - 3:08
"Sing, Sing, Sing" - 4:38
"Mountain Spring" - 4:50
"Mahatma" - 6:16
"What's Going On?" - 3:51
"Row" - 3:31
"Calypso Jam" - 3:35
"Seven Wicked Reels" - 4:18
"Spazz Jazz" - 2:48
"The Ukraine" - 3:08
"Paralyzed" - 3:23
"Allen's Bar" - 3:34
"Until We Meet Again" - 3:56
"Joe's Favorite" (Live Medley) - 3:44

Personnel

Band
Denis Dufresne - violin, vocals
Scott Duncan - violin, vocals
Bob Fenske - percussion, mallet instruments
Errol Fischer - violin, vocals
Allison Granger - violin, vocals, tin whistle
Tim Harley - bass
Roxanne Leitch - violin, vocals, tin whistle, low whistle
Ken Macrae - drums
Lynae Dufresne - violin, vocals
Aaron Young - guitar, mandolin
Josh Zubot - violin, vocals

Guest musicians
John Hyde - acoustic bass

Others
John Crozman - A&R
Jana Wyber - A&R
Anthony Moore - A&R

References

Barrage (group) albums
2000 debut albums